Panaeolus papilionaceus, also known as Agaricus calosus, Panaeolus campanulatus, Panaeolus retirugis, and Panaeolus sphinctrinus, and commonly known as Petticoat mottlegill, is a very common and widely distributed little brown mushroom that feeds on dung.

This mushroom is the type species for the genus Panaeolus.

Description
Cap: 1–5 cm across, obtusely conic, grayish brown, not hygrophanous, becoming campanulate in age, margin adorned with white toothlike partial veil fragments when young or towards the edge, flesh thin.
Gills: adnate to adnexed close to crowded, one or two tiers of intermediate gills, pale gray, acquiring a mottled, blackish appearance in age, with whitish edges.
Spores: 12–18 x 7–10 µm, elliptical, smooth, with an apical pore, spore print black.
Stipe: 6–12 cm by 2–4 mm, gray-brown to reddish brown, darker where handled, paler toward the apex, brittle, fibrous, and pruinose.
Odor: Mild.
Taste: Unappetizing.
Microscopic features: Basidia 4-sterigmate; abruptly clavate. Cheilocystidia abundant; subcylindric, often subcapitate or capitate.

Habitat and formation
Occurring singly, gregariously, or caespitosely on cow/horse dung, moose droppings, and in pastures. Widely distributed in North America throughout the year, but only in warmer climates in winter. It can be found in countries including Canada (Alberta, British Columbia), the United States (Alabama, Alaska, California, Colorado, Florida, Georgia, Indiana, Louisiana, Maine, Massachusetts, Missouri, Montana, New Mexico, New York, Oklahoma, Texas, Washington), the Caribbean (Bahamas, Cuba, San Vincent Island), Chile, Colombia, Uruguay, France, The Netherlands, Greece, Mexico, Norway, Slovenia, South Africa, Uganda, China, Iran, Lithuania, Kuwait, and the Philippines.

Edibility

Panaeolus papilionaceus is inedible, and is neither choice in flavor nor substantial in mass. While similar looking species, such as Panaeolus cinctulus, do contain psilocybin, Panaeolus papilionaceus does not.

Gallery

See also

List of Panaeolus species

References

External links
 Mushroom Expert - Panaeolus papilionaceus
 Mykoweb - Panaeolus papilionaceus
 Observations on Mushroom Observer

papilionaceus
Fungi of Europe
Fungi of North America
Inedible fungi